Archips stellatus is a species of moth of the family Tortricidae that is endemic to Japan.

References

External links

Moths described in 2006
Endemic fauna of Japan
Moths of Japan
stellatus